Austroagrion exclamationis  is a species of damselfly in the family Coenagrionidae,
commonly known as a northern billabongfly. 
It is a small damselfly; the male is blue and black.
It has been recorded from New Guinea and northern Australia,
where it inhabits streams and still water.

Gallery

See also
 List of Odonata species of Australia

References 

Coenagrionidae
Odonata of Australia
Insects of Australia
Insects of New Guinea
Taxa named by Herbert Campion
Insects described in 1915
Damselflies